Beaverton North Aerodrome  is a registered aerodrome located  northeast of Beaverton, Ontario, Canada.

References

Registered aerodromes in Ontario